Unleashed Software is a New Zealand-based software-as-a-service company that provides cloud based inventory management.

History

Unleashed Software was founded in 2009 by Greg Murphy and Terry Patmore. The company originally began in Auckland, New Zealand inside of Massey University. Since then, they have expanded globally with a presence in Australia, the UK, and the USA.

In 2012, the company updated their platform with a drag and drop feature to allow users to customise and sort reports. The upgrade was said to make the software easier to navigate and more pleasant to look at. The same year the company entered into an exclusive deal with NZPM Group, New Zealand's second largest plumbing supplier, to provide live pricing of approximately 40,000 items to users of their production systems tools.

Unleashed Software moved their offices to Takapuna, Auckland in 2013. The move was to bring their offices closer to their employees, 80% of whom were reported to live on the North Shore of New Zealand.

Unleashed Software raised $2 million in venture capital in September 2012, and a further $4 million in October 2013 to expand its sales staff and developers. In 2013 it was also reported that Unleashed paid its workers approximately 20% higher than the local market average. In June 2015, they secured $4.5 million to support trans-Tasman growth, international expansion, and product development.

In October 2017, Unleashed Software secured a Series C investment of NZ$7.0 million from Movac, one of New Zealand's most experienced technology investment company. The investment funds will go towards fuelling the development of the next generation inventory management software and support the global growth of the company.

In June 2020 Unleashed was ranked one of the top 20 “Front Runners" in Software Advice’s Guide to Top Inventory Management Software, and was included in the Capterra Top 20 for Inventory Management report.

In October 2020 Unleashed won the Supreme Business Excellence award at the Westpac Auckland Business Awards Best of the Best event for 2019.

On November 12, 2020, Unleashed management announced that Unleashed had been acquired by UK-based The Access Group.

Products and service

Unleashed Software provides inventory management tools that are primarily used for business-to-business traders. The tools integrate with other online business software programs such as Xero's accounting system and Magento eCommerce.

Inventory management is the main tool of Unleashed Software. It allows import and export of inventory through CSV files. Once inventory is entered or uploaded into the software, customers can create reports, graphs, and track inventory, including from multiple warehouse locations. It also has an ecommerce feature that allows an online store, offline sales, and accounting data. Inventory is updated automatically based on sales. There is also a customer relationship management feature to track clients by contact details and recent activity.

Unleashed has a partner program where they assist companies in gaining knowledge about stock control and the use of Unleashed Software. The program includes training from experts, providing business with the support they need to manage their inventory. They also have an API for developers which allows them to integrate Unleashed Software with other systems. This allows companies to maintain their current software systems but integrate Unleashed as their inventory management tool.

See also

 Software as a service
 Cloud computing

References

Service-oriented (business computing)
Software companies established in 2009
Cloud communication platforms
Software companies of New Zealand
Companies based in Auckland
New Zealand companies established in 2009